Hamburg, officially the Free and Hanseatic City of Hamburg, is Germany's second-largest city and a federated state.

Hamburg may also refer to:

Places

Germany
 Port of Hamburg, the deep-water harbor of Hamburg

United States
 Glenville, North Carolina, formerly Hamburg
 Hamburg, Alabama, an unincorporated community 
 Hamburg, Arkansas, a town
 Hamburg, Connecticut, a town
 Hamburg, Illinois, a village
 Hamburg Precinct, Calhoun County, Illinois, a precinct and township
 Hamburg, Clark County, Indiana, unincorporated community
 Hamburg, Franklin County, Indiana, unincorporated community
 Hamburg, Iowa, a city
 Hamburg, Louisiana, an unincorporated community
 Hamburg Township, Michigan, a township
 Hamburg, Minnesota, a town and city
 Hamburg, Missouri, a ghost town
 Hamburg, New Jersey, a borough
 Hamburg, New York, three places
 Hamburg, Fairfield County, Ohio, an unincorporated community
 Hamburg, Preble County, Ohio, an unincorporated community
 Hamburg, Pennsylvania, a borough
 Hamburg, Aiken County, South Carolina
 Hamburg (community), Marathon County, Wisconsin, a town
 Hamburg, Marathon County, Wisconsin, a town
 Hamburg, Vernon County, Wisconsin, a town
 Hamburg State Park in Georgia
 Hamburg Street (Baltimore Light Rail station)
 Highwood, Hamden, a neighborhood in Hamden, Connecticut, formerly Hamburg

Elsewhere
 German name of Brezovička, Slovakia, municipality
 Hamburg (oil field) in Alberta, Canada, town
 Hamburg, Eastern Cape, South Africa, a city

Plants and animals
 Hamburg (chicken), a breed of chicken
 Hamburg (horse) (1895–1915), a champion of thoroughbred horse racing
 Ulmus 'Hamburg', a tree

Ships
 , a 
 Hamburg (barque) (1886), a Canadian sailing barque
 , German military ship class
 MS Hamburg (1997), a cruise ship
 , a German ocean liner
 SS Hamburg (1969), a German cruise ship operated by German Atlantic Line 1969–1973
 USS Powhatan (ID-3013), originally the SS Hamburg (1899), a transport ship of the United States Navy

Other uses 
 Black Hambourg, another name for the German/Italian wine grape Trollinger
 Black Hamburg, another name for the German wine grape Black Muscat
 Hamburg, a short form sometimes used for hamburger
 Hamburg steak, a patty of ground beef
 Hamburg, a group in the Sri Lankan grading system for cinnamon quills
 Hamburg (surname), a German surname. Notable people see there
 Hamburg/ESO Survey, a star catalog published by the University of Hamburg
 Hamburg High School (Arkansas), Hamburg, Arkansas
 Hamburg High School (Hamburg, New York)
 Hamburg International, a defunct independent airline

See also 

 
 List of songs about Hamburg
 New Hamburg (disambiguation)
 Hamberg (disambiguation)
 Hamburger (disambiguation)
 Hamburgh (disambiguation)
 Homburg (disambiguation)
 Gamburg (disambiguation)